Story of a Girl may refer to:
 "Absolutely (Story of a Girl)", a 2000 song by Nine Days
 Story of a Girl (novel), a 2007 young-adult novel by Sara Zarr
 Story of a Girl (film), a 2017 TV movie based on the novel